Synsepalum is a genus of trees and shrubs in the chicle family, Sapotaceae described as a genus in 1852.

Synsepalum is native to the tropical lowlands of Africa.

Species

References

External links

 
Sapotaceae genera